Bogoria is a genus of epiphytic orchids native to insular Southeast Asia (Borneo, Java, Sumatra, New Guinea and the Philippines). It contains 4 species:

Bogoria merrillii (Ames) Garay - Mindanao
Bogoria papuana Schltr. - Papua New Guinea
Bogoria raciborskii J.J.Sm. -  Java + Borneo
Bogoria taeniorhiza (Schltr.) Schltr. - Sumatra

References

External links 

Aeridinae
Vandeae genera
Epiphytic orchids